The Men's team time trial of the 2014 UCI Road World Championships was a cycling event that took place on 21 September 2014 in Ponferrada, Spain. It was the 30th edition of the championship, and the 3rd since its reintroduction in 2012. Belgian team  were the defending champions, having won in both 2012 and 2013.

Course
The team time trial started in the centre of Ponferrada and passed through La Martina, Posada del Bierzo, Carracedelo and Cacabelos before returning to Ponferrada.

Qualification

It was an obligation for all 2014 UCI ProTeams to participate. As well as this, invitations were sent to the 20 leading teams of the 2014 UCI Europe Tour, the top 5 leading teams of the 2013–14 UCI America Tour and 2013–14 UCI Asia Tour and the leading teams of the 2013–14 UCI Africa Tour and 2014 UCI Oceania Tour on 15 August 2014. Teams that accepted the invitation within the deadline had the right to participate. Every participating team were allowed to register nine riders from its team roster, with the exception of stagiaires, and had to select six riders to compete in the event. In total, 29 teams competed in the event.

Schedule
All times are in Central European Time (UTC+1).

Prize money
The UCI assigned premiums for the top 5 finishers, with a total prize money of €107,198.

Final classification

References

Men's team time trial
Men's team time trial
UCI Road World Championships – Men's team time trial
2014 in men's road cycling